Eroilor is a metro station in Bucharest. It is located near the Cotroceni neighbourhood, servicing the Bucharest Metro lines M1, M3, and M5.

History 
The station was opened on 19 November 1979 as part of the inaugural section of Bucharest Metro, between Semănătoarea and Timpuri Noi. On 19 August 1983, the extension to Industriilor was opened. On 15 September 2020, the inaugural section of M5, from Eroilor to Valea Ialomiței and Râul Doamnei started operation.

As part of the M5 Line (Drumul Taberei – Universitate – Pantelimon), a new terminal, Eroilor 2, was constructed underneath the existing platforms. It was opened on 15 September 2020.

Details 
Eroilor is the last station where lines M1 and M3 run together, each diverging towards different directions (in the westbound direction). It is thus also where M1 and M3 meet in their eastbound directions. The station itself has three tracks – a central platform with two lateral tracks (track 1 and 3) and a lateral platform serving track 2. Trains coming from Grozăvești (M1) use track 3, trains coming from Politehnica (M3) use track 1, while trains coming from Izvor use track 2, no matter the direction they are going to follow requiring the use of an audio signal for identification of the line the train will follow. Behind the station walls, two other tracks exist (designated as tracks 4 and 5), that are used to store reserve trains, that are kept ready-to-run in case of another train malfunctioning or an unexpected increase in passenger loads. Track 4 however, is being currently converted to a passenger track (the wall separating it from track 2 will be demolished).

Until the completion of the Nicolae Grigorescu – Anghel Saligny line, the station was the terminus for line M3, that had been shortened to Preciziei – Eroilor. Regular operation for M3 restarted on 6 July 2009, when M3 became Preciziei- Eroilor – Nicolae Grigorescu – Anghel Saligny.

Colour scheme 
The station was designed using a wide and open floorplan, with a dominant color scheme of white (obtained by using white marble columns) and pale yellow (from the floor tiles). These were initially intended to be complemented by a tone of red and orange through the use of red brick wall lining, of red and orange lighted signage and of incandescent light bulbs for some lateral illumination (it was the only station to use any incandescent light bulbs, all others were designed to use solely fluorescent lamps). However, as both the incandescent lamps and the orange signage were replaced with the more conventional fluorescent white tubes, these red tones disappeared.

References

Bucharest Metro stations
Railway stations opened in 1979
1979 establishments in Romania
Railway stations opened in 2020
2020 establishments in Romania